Stephen A. (Steve) Lavin (born April 23, 1967) is a Republican member of the Montana Legislature.  He was elected to House District  8 which represents the Kalispell, Montana area.

In February 2013, Lavin gained nationwide media attention for introducing a bill that would allow an authorized representative to vote in municipal elections on behalf of a corporation owning property in that municipality.  Lavin later said that he introduced the bill at the request of a constituent.  He believed the bill merely allowed non-resident property owners to vote in elections and did not realize that the bill would also allow representatives to vote on behalf of corporations.  The bill died in committee.

In 2020, Lavin, then a Major in the Montana Highway Patol, was selected to become the new Colonel, succeeding the retirement of Colonel Tom Butler. At the beginning of 2021, Lavin assumed the role of the Colonel of the Montana Highway Patrol.

References

External links
Campaign homepage

Living people
1967 births
Republican Party members of the Montana House of Representatives
Montana State University alumni
Politicians from Kalispell, Montana
21st-century American politicians